Events from the year 1799 in Denmark.

Incumbents
 Monarch – Christian VII
 Prime minister – Christian Günther von Bernstorff

Births
 22 March – Henrik Nikolai Krøyer, zoologist and zoology teacher and textbook author (died 1870)
 30 October – Emil Bærentzen, painter (died 1868)

References

 
Years of the 18th century in Denmark
Denmark
Denmark
1790s in Denmark